= Noël van Berlaimont =

Noël Simonsz van Berlaimont (died 1531) was an educator and educational writer in the early-16th-century Low Countries.

== Life ==
Berlaimont was a teacher of French and a member of the Antwerp guild of schoolmasters. He was married to Anna van den Beempde, with whom he had at least one child. Berlaimont was the author of two educational works to help speakers of Dutch learn French, the Vocabulare and the posthumously published Conjugacien. The Vocabulare was enormously popular and was printed about 150 times between 1527 and 1759. Berlaimont died in Antwerp in 1531.

== Writings ==
- Vocabulare (Antwerp, 1527)
- Die conjugacien in Franchoys ende in Duytsch oft in Vlaems (Antwerp, 1545)
